Dating system may refer to:

Any system of chronological dating, especially
A calendar era, a system of year numbers
Any system employed in dating (courtship)